Dispersionless (or quasi-classical) limits of integrable partial differential equations (PDE)  arise in various problems of mathematics and physics and have been intensively studied in recent literature (see e.g. references below). They typically arise when considering slowly modulated long waves of an integrable dispersive PDE system.

Examples

Dispersionless KP equation
The dispersionless Kadomtsev–Petviashvili equation (dKPE), also known (up to an inessential linear change of variables) as the Khokhlov–Zabolotskaya equation, has the form

It arises from the commutation

of the following pair of 1-parameter families of vector fields

where  is a spectral parameter. The dKPE is the -dispersionless limit of the celebrated Kadomtsev–Petviashvili equation, arising when considering long waves of that system. The dKPE, like many other (2+1)-dimensional integrable dispersionless systems,  admits a (3+1)-dimensional generalization.

The Benney moment equations
The dispersionless KP system is closely related to the Benney moment hierarchy, each of which is a dispersionless integrable system:

These arise as the consistency condition between

and the simplest two evolutions in the hierarchy are:

The dKP is recovered on setting 

If one sets , so that the countably many moments  are expressed in terms of just two functions, the classical shallow water equations result:

These may also be derived from considering slowly modulated wave train solutions of the nonlinear Schrodinger equation. Such 'reductions', expressing the moments in terms of finitely many dependent variables, are described by the Gibbons-Tsarev equation.

Dispersionless Korteweg–de Vries equation
The dispersionless Korteweg–de Vries equation (dKdVE) reads as

It is the dispersionless or quasiclassical limit of the Korteweg–de Vries equation.
It is satisfied by -independent solutions of the dKP system.
It is also obtainable from the -flow of the Benney hierarchy on setting

Dispersionless Novikov–Veselov  equation
The dispersionless Novikov-Veselov equation is most commonly written as the following equation for a real-valued function :

where the following standard notation of complex analysis is used: , . The function  here is an auxiliary function,  defined uniquely from  up to a holomorphic summand.

Multidimensional integrable dispersionless systems
See  for systems with contact Lax pairs, and e.g., and references therein for other systems.

See also
 Integrable systems
 Nonlinear Schrödinger equation
  Nonlinear systems
 Davey–Stewartson equation
 Dispersive partial differential equation
 Kadomtsev–Petviashvili equation
 Korteweg–de Vries equation

References

 Kodama Y., Gibbons J. "Integrability of the dispersionless KP hierarchy", Nonlinear World 1, (1990).
 Zakharov V.E. "Dispersionless limit of integrable systems in 2+1 dimensions", Singular Limits of Dispersive Waves, NATO ASI series, Volume 320, 165-174, (1994).
 
 
 
 
 Dunajski M. "Solitons, instantons and twistors", Oxford University Press, 2010.
 
 Takebe T. "Lectures on Dispersionless Integrable Hierarchies", 2014,
https://rikkyo.repo.nii.ac.jp/index.php?action=pages_view_main&active_action=repository_action_common_download&item_id=9046&item_no=1&attribute_id=22&file_no=1&page_id=13&block_id=49

External links
Ishimori_system at the dispersive equations wiki

Partial differential equations
Integrable systems